Jason Ramos (born October 9, 1998) is an American soccer player who plays as a defender for Minnesota United 2 in the MLS Next Pro.

Career

Chattanooga Red Wolves
Following a closed tryout with the club, Ramos signed for Chattanooga in January 2020. He made his debut for the club on 25 July 2020, playing the entirety of a 2–2 away draw with Tormenta FC. At the end of the 2021 season, Ramos was named to the USL League One All-League First Team.

Minnesota United 2
On February 8, 2022, Ramos signed with MLS Next Pro side Minnesota United 2 ahead of their inaugural season. He made his competitive debut for the club on March 26, 2022, coming on as a late substitute for Callum Montgomery in a 3–1 defeat to North Texas SC. After making 19 appearances for the club during the 2022 season, he returned to the team for 2023.

Personal life
Ramos was born to a Mexican father and a Honduran mother. His favorite player is Sergio Ramos.

References

External links
Jason Ramos at Cal Poly Pomona Athletics

1998 births
Living people
Cal Poly Pomona Broncos soccer
Chattanooga Red Wolves SC players
USL League One players
American soccer players
Soccer players from California
Sportspeople from Montebello, California
Association football defenders
Cal Poly Pomona Broncos athletes
Mt. SAC Mounties men's soccer players
MLS Next Pro players